The men's tournament of the 2012 Canadian Senior Curling Championships was held from March 17 to 25.

Qualifying round
Four associations did not automatically qualify to the championships, and participated in a qualifying round held at the Langley Curling Club in Langley, British Columbia. Two qualification spots were awarded to the winners of a double knockout round.

Teams
The teams are listed as follows:

*Nunavut did not enter a team in the qualifying round.

Knockout brackets

Knockout results
All times listed are in Pacific Standard Time.

First knockout
Thursday, March 15, 9:00 am

Thursday, March 15, 2:00 pm

Second knockout
Thursday, March 15, 7:00 pm

Teams
The teams are listed as follows:

Round-robin standings
Final round-robin standings

Round-robin results
All times listed are in Pacific Standard Time.

Draw 2
Saturday, March 17, 1:30 pm

Draw 4
Sunday, March 18, 9:00 am

Draw 5
Sunday, March 18, 1:30 pm

Draw 6
Sunday, March 18, 7:00 pm

Draw 7
Monday, March 19, 8:00 am

Draw 8
Monday, March 19, 12:00 pm

Draw 9
Monday, March 19, 4:30 pm

Draw 10
Monday, March 19, 8:30 pm

Draw 11
Tuesday, March 20, 9:00 am

Draw 12
Tuesday, March 20, 1:30 pm

Draw 13
Tuesday, March 20, 6:30 pm

Draw 14
Wednesday, March 21, 9:00 am

Draw 16
Wednesday, March 21, 6:30 pm

Draw 18
Thursday, March 22, 1:30 pm

Draw 20
Friday, March 23, 9:00 am

Draw 22
Friday, March 23, 6:30 pm

Playoffs

Semifinal
Saturday, March 24, 7:00 pm

Final
Sunday, March 25, 11:00 am

References

External links
Home Page

2012, Men's tournament
Senior Curling Championships, Men's tournament